The Erco is a stream in the department of Haute-Corse, Corsica, France.
It is a tributary of the Golo.

Course

It crosses the communes of Calacuccia, Corscia and Lozzi.
The stream originates in the commune of Lozzi to the south of the  Monte Cinto.
It flows in a generally southeast direction to its confluence with the Golo between Calacuccia and Corscia.
The D84 road crosses the Erco just above its mouth, but otherwise there are no roads along its course.

Hydrology

Measurements of the stream flow were taken at the Calacuccia [Cuccia] station from 1979 to 1993.

Tributaries
The following streams (ruisseaux) are tributaries of the Erco:

 Forcu Ario 
 Cappiaghia 
 Pulella 
 Tileri 
 Travizzolu 
 Forcioli 
 Monte Cinto 
 Osu 
 Alzi Mozzi

Notes

Sources

Rivers of Haute-Corse
Rivers of France